Richmond County Airport , formerly known as Rockingham-Hamlet Airport, is a public airport located in and operated by Richmond County, North Carolina. It is situated three miles (5 km) south of the city of Rockingham and west of the city of Hamlet. The airport is used entirely for general aviation and has undergone major renovations and expansion in recent years.

Facilities 
 Runway 4/22: 3,000 x 500 ft. (914 x 152 m), Surface: Turf
 Runway 14/32: 5,000 x 100 ft. (1,524 x 30 m), Surface: Asphalt

References

External links 
  at North Carolina DOT airport guide
 

Airports in North Carolina
Transportation in Richmond County, North Carolina
Buildings and structures in Richmond County, North Carolina